Tyrone Power (May 5, 1914 – November 15, 1958) appeared in a total of 48 feature-length motion pictures.

Film

Box Office Ranking

1938 - 10th
1939 - 2nd
1940 - 5th
1941 - 11th
1942 - 13th
1943 - 14th, 9th (UK)
1947 - 20th

Career Appraisal
When Tyrone Power left 20th Century Fox in 1952 he said that his favorite movie made at the studio was Nightmare Alley "but the studio did nothing to sell it and it wasn't a success." He said his most popular movies were Alexander's Ragtime Band, Jesse James, The Mark of Zorro and Blood and Sand. His least favorite were Day-Time Wife, Prince of Foxes, Captain from Castile and Rose of Washington Square.

References

Bibliography
 Belafonte, Denis, and Alvin H. Marill.  The Films of Tyrone Power. New York, NY. Citadel Press, 1979.

Male actor filmographies
American filmographies